Schöneck is a municipality in the Main-Kinzig district, in Hesse, Germany. It is situated 9 km northwest of Hanau, and 15 km northeast of Frankfurt and has 12,576 inhabitants (as of 2016-12-31).

Notable people 
 Johannes Meffert (1732-1795), born in Schöneck, immigrated to the United States and settled in Kentucky, changing his last name to Mefford. Children's entertainer Fred Rogers and Hollywood actor Tom Hanks are among his descendants.

References

External links 
 Website Schöneck (in German)

Municipalities in Hesse
Main-Kinzig-Kreis